Onthophagus landolti is a species of dung beetle in the family Scarabaeidae.

Subspecies
These two subspecies belong to the species Onthophagus landolti:
 Onthophagus landolti landolti Harold, 1880 i g
 Onthophagus landolti texanus Schaeffer, 1914 i c g
Data sources: i = ITIS, c = Catalogue of Life, g = GBIF, b = Bugguide.net

References

Further reading

 

Scarabaeinae
Articles created by Qbugbot
Beetles described in 1880